The UCI 1.HC and UCI 2.HC are the second tier classification of road cycling races by the UCI, after the UCI World Tour (or its predecessor, the UCI ProTour). The races are part of the various UCI Continental Circuits. The 1.HC events are one-day races, whereas the 2.HC events are stage races. 'HC' stands for the  French phrase hors catégorie, which means beyond categorization. In 2020, the .HC races will be replaced by the UCI ProSeries

Team participation
In .HC events, UCI WorldTeams may participate, up to a maximum of 70%. The rest of the teams participating may be UCI Professional Continental teams, UCI continental teams and National teams.

List of 1.HC events

List of 2.HC events

Winners by race
The following lists show the winners of .HC races since the introduction of the UCI Continental Circuits in 2005 until the disappearance of the class in 2020.
 A dark grey cell indicates the race was not held in that year.
 A light blue cell indicates the race was held in a lower category (2.1/1.1 or lower) in that year.
 A gold cell indicates the race was part of the UCI ProTour or UCI World Tour in that year.

1.HC Winners
2005–2013

2014–2019

2.HC Winners
2005–2013

2014–2019

Most race wins

References

Union Cycliste Internationale